Fox Sports is the brand name for a number of sports channels, broadcast divisions, programming, and other media around the world.

The Fox Sports name has since been used for other sports media assets. These assets are held mainly by the Fox Corporation, with the exceptions of the operations in Australia, which are part of Foxtel (majority-owned by Fox Corp. sister company News Corp Australia) and the operations in Mexico are owned by Grupo Multimedia Lauman while the operations in Argentina are owned by Mediapro but branding and contents are licensed to Fox Corporation and the rest of the international Fox Sports channels were sold to The Walt Disney Company, following the acquisition.

Divisions
 Fox Sports (United States), also known as the Fox Sports Media Group.
 Fox Sports International, an international sports programming and production entity of The Walt Disney Company (previously owned by the Fox Networks Group until Disney's acquisition of most 21st Century Fox assets), which distributes sports programming to various countries.
 Fox Sports Australia, formerly Premier Media Group, owned by Foxtel (65% owned by Murdoch-controlled News Corp Australia with Telstra).
 Fox Sports Argentina, owned by Mediapro, branding licensed to Fox Corporation
 Fox Sports Mexico, owned by Grupo Multimedia Lauman branding licensed to Fox Corporation
 FoxSports.com, a sports news website.
 Fox Sports Radio is a national sports talk radio network managed by Premiere Networks in partnership with Fox Sports.

Channels

Current channels

Australia
 Fox Sports (Australia), a group of sports channels
 Fox Sports News 500 - Cable and satellite channel that continuously televises sports news 24 hours per day.
 Fox Cricket 501 - A 24-hour dedicated Cricket channel
 Fox League 502 - A 24-hour dedicated Rugby League channel
 Fox Sports 503
 Fox Footy 504 - primarily features the Australian Football League
 Fox Sports 505
 Fox Sports 506
 Fox Sports More+ 507

Argentina 
 Fox Sports (Argentina), is an Argentine pay television network that broadcasts in Argentina.
 Fox Sports
 Fox Sports 2: formerly known as Fox Sports+
 Fox Sports 3: formerly known as Speed Channel, it was launched in 2012 and its programming is car-related.

Brazil
 Fox Sports 2: launched on January 24, 2014. Now run by Disney; will remain under that name until 31 December 2022, due to contractual language with CONMEBOL regarding its coverage of the 2022 Copa Libertadores.

Mexico 
 Fox Sports (Mexico), is a Mexican pay television network that broadcasts in Mexico.
 Fox Sports
 Fox Sports 2: formerly known as Fox Sports+
 Fox Sports 3: formerly known as Speed Channel, it was launched in 2012 and its programming is car-related.
 Fox Sports Premium, is a pay-TV channel launched in 2022, it is specialised in broadcasting Mexican First Football Division matches.

United States 
 Fox Sports 1 is a national sports network.
 Fox Sports 2 is a national sports network.
 Fox Deportes presents sports programming in Spanish.
 Fox Soccer Plus, a network with extended coverage of soccer and other international sport events; remains in operation even after closure of Fox Soccer.

Former channels

Africa
 Fox Sports Africa, launched in August 2014 in Sub-Saharan Africa.

Asia
 Fox Sports, was a group of sports channels available in East and Southeast Asia, formerly ESPN Star Sports. These channels were closed on  October 1, 2021.
 Fox Sports, formerly ESPN.
 Fox Sports 2, formerly Star Sports.
 Fox Sports 3, formerly ESPN HD and Fox Sports Plus HD.

Brazil
 Fox Sports Brazil, It was the Brazilian division  of Fox Sports, that included 2 channels aimed at broadcasting sporting events 24 hours a day. 
 Fox Sports: since February 5, 2012 the channel was already available in all Brazil. On January 17, 2022, Fox Sports was renamed ESPN 4.

Canada
 Fox Sports World Canada, a defunct specialty channel primarily featuring soccer and other events around the world that operated from 2001 to 2012.

Latin America 
 Fox Sports, was a group of channels broadcast across Mexico, Central, and South America. Its main channel was rebranded in January 2022 as ESPN4:
 Fox Sports
 Fox Sports 3 (not available in Brazil): formerly known as Speed Channel, it was launched in 2012
 Fox Sports Premium, is a pay-TV channel launched in 2017, it specialises in broadcasting Argentine First Football Division matches. Was rebranded as ESPN Premium.

Middle East
 Fox Sports Middle East was a sports channel that was distributed by Star Select as part of package television channels.

Netherlands
 Fox Sports (Netherlands) was a group of sports channels owned by Eredivisie Media & Marketing which for 51% was owned by Fox Networks Group Benelux, the channels was rebranded as ESPN.
 Fox Sports Eredivisie, 3 premium channels. It held the exclusive rights for the live matches of the Eredivisie, the highest Dutch football division.
 Fox Sports International (Netherlands), 3 premium channels covered several European football leagues.

Israel
 Fox Sports Israel was first broadcast in Israel back in 2001 by satellite provider yes and since 2010 it broadcasts the HD version of the channel.

Italy
 Fox Sports Italy was an Italian sports channel launched in 2013 alongside Fox Sports Plus and Fox Sports 2, which carries soccer, MLB, NFL, NCAA Sports, Volley Champions League and Euroleague Basketball. In 2018, the channel has been dissolved.

Turkey
 Fox Sports Turkey was a sports channel that was distributed by the Turkish provider Digiturk.

South Korea
 JTBC3 Fox Sports, a sports channel was owned by joint owned by Fox Networks Group Asia Pacific and JTBC.

Japan
 Fox Sports & Entertainment began producing sports shows in 2013, which are broadcast in several Fox channels. The channel closed on March 31, 2020.

United States
 Fox College Sports was a suite of three region-specific networks devoted to college sports that were sold to Diamond Sports Group in 2019.
 Fox Sports Networks was a collection of cable TV regional sports networks broadcasting across the United States that was sold to Diamond Sports Group in 2019. In 2021, Fox Sports is gone, with the channels now being branded as Bally Sports. These regional channels include:
 Fox Sports Arizona
 Fox Sports Carolinas
 Fox Sports Detroit
 Fox Sports Florida
 Fox Sports Indiana
 Fox Sports Kansas City
 Fox Sports Midwest
 Fox Sports New Orleans
 Fox Sports North
 Fox Sports Ohio
 Fox Sports Oklahoma
 Fox Sports San Diego
 Fox Sports South
 Fox Sports Southeast
 Fox Sports Southwest
 Fox Sports Sun
 Fox Sports Tennessee
 Fox Sports West
 Fox Sports Wisconsin
 Fox Sports Northwest
 Fox Sports Pittsburgh
 Fox Sports Rocky Mountain
 Fox Sports Utah
 Prime Ticket
 SportsTime Ohio
 YES Network

See also
 Fox Sports (United States)
 Fox Sports International
 Sky Sports

References

External links

 
Cable network groups in the United States